Mexico competed at the 2013 World Aquatics Championships in Barcelona, Spain between 19 July to 4 August 2013.

Medalists

Diving

Mexico has qualified 13 divers.

Men

Women

High diving

Mexico qualified 2 high divers.

Open water swimming

Mexico qualified 6 open water swimmers.

Swimming

Mexican swimmers earned qualifying standards in the following events (up to a maximum of 2 swimmers in each event at the A-standard entry time, and 1 at the B-standard):

Men

Women

Synchronized swimming

Mexico has qualified 13 synchronized swimmers.

References

External links
Barcelona 2013 Official Site

Nations at the 2013 World Aquatics Championships
2013 in Mexican sports
Mexico at the World Aquatics Championships